Pavol Straka (born 13 December 1980) is a Slovak football player who currently plays for ESV Schwarzenau. Pavol Straka made his debut for Antalyaspor against Çaykur Rizespor on 6 August 2006. He also scored Antalyaspor's 500th Turkish Super League goal in a match against Kayseri Erciyesspor which Antalyaspor won 3-1.

References

1980 births
Living people
Antalyaspor footballers
Expatriate footballers in Turkey
Slovak expatriate footballers
Slovak footballers
Sportspeople from Trenčín
FK Dubnica players
FK Jablonec players
MŠK Žilina players
FK Viktoria Žižkov players
Slovak expatriate sportspeople in Turkey
Slovak Super Liga players
Süper Lig players
AS Trenčín players
Spartak Myjava players
Association football forwards